Andrew Elias Kashita (1932 – 13 January 2020) was a Zambian politician. He served as Member of the National Assembly and held several ministerial posts.

Biography
An engineer by training, Kashita became Permanent Secretary to the Ministry of Agriculture and then managing director of INDECO (Industrial Development Corporation of Zambia). He was appointed Minister of Mines and Industry in 1973, and was also given a nominated seat in the National Assembly. He was deemed by the United States to be an excellent technocrat and manager, but not a good politician. As a result of his independence, he was dismissed from both positions in January 1975. He later became executive director of Zincom.

In 1990 Kashita returned to politics as one of the founder members of the Movement for Multi-Party Democracy. He was elected to the National Assembly in the Bwana Mkubwa constituency in the 1991 general elections, and was appointed Minister of Transport and Communications. He was later moved to become Minister of Works and Supply in a cabinet reshuffle in January 1994, but was sacked on 17 July 1995.  He did not contest the 1996 general elections.

Kashita died on 13 January 2020.

References

1932 births
Zambian engineers
Zambian civil servants
United National Independence Party politicians
Movement for Multi-Party Democracy politicians
Members of the National Assembly of Zambia
Mines ministers of Zambia
Transport ministers of Zambia
Works and Supply ministers of Zambia
2020 deaths
Place of birth missing
Place of death missing
Date of birth missing